Hold On is an EP by Spencer Tracy, released 5 July 2004. The EP features the new sound of Spencer Tracy with the dual vocals of Shaun Sibbes and Jessicca Bennett (who co-wrote the Lash hit "Take Me Away"). It's closer to rock than the previous pop inclined releases from Spencer Tracy and features a version of the Lennon / McCartney track "I've Got a Feelin'" plus reworks of "Ocean" and "Supergirl".

Siân at the Oz Music Project is more critical and states "the EP sounds like the first from a promising garage band, not a release from a nationally recognised act. The songs aren’t terrible, granted, but then again the songs aren’t all that great either."

Track listing 
All tracks written by Lee Jones unless otherwise noted.

 "Hold On" (Shaun Sibbes, Jessicca Bennett)
 "Take Me Home" (Jessicca Bennett)
 "I've Got A Feelin'" (J. Lennon, P. McCartney)
 "Ocean" (Shaun's Mix) 
 "Supergirl" (Kim's Mix)

Personnel

Spencer Tracy
 Lee Jones - Guitars, Vocals & Piano,
 John Rabjones - Guitars & Vocals,
 Kim Jones - Bass Guitar
 Shaun Sibbes - Drums & Vocals

Additional musicians
 Jessicca Bennett - Vocals & Guitar

References

2003 EPs
Spencer Tracy (band) EPs